Kaja's sixgill sawshark (Pliotrema kajae) is a species of sawshark in the family Pristiophoridae found in Madagascar and the Mascarene Plateau.

Pliotrema kajae has its barbels situated roughly half way from the rostral tip to the mouth. It also has longer snout, more numerous rostral teeth, and lighter brown dorsal coloration if compared to Pliotrema annae (Anna's sixgill sawshark).

References 

Pristiophoridae
Fish described in 2020